Kevin John Sefcik (born February 10, 1971) is a former Major League Baseball utility player. He was active for seven seasons, from  through .

The vast majority of Sefcik's major league service was with the Philadelphia Phillies. His lone appearance with another major league team was a single at-bat with Colorado in June, 2001.

During his career, Sefcik appeared in 425 games, amassing a total of 212 hits, six home runs, and 56 RBI. His career batting average was .275.

He currently lives in Orland Park Illinois, and is the father of Zach Sefcik, Luke Sefcik, and Cal Sefcik. He is a baseball coach at Marist High School.He also is a proud former owner of an Orland Park Jimmy John’s.

External links

1971 births
Batavia Clippers players
Clearwater Phillies players
Reading Phillies players
Scranton/Wilkes-Barre Red Barons players
Buffalo Bisons (minor league) players
Colorado Springs Sky Sox players
Altoona Curve players
Colorado Rockies players
Living people
Major League Baseball outfielders
Major League Baseball infielders
Baseball players from Illinois
Philadelphia Phillies players
People from Tinley Park, Illinois
Saint Xavier Cougars baseball players

he has 2 sons luke and zach